Robo-advisors or robo-advisers are a class of financial adviser that provide financial advice and investment management online with moderate to minimal human intervention. They provide digital financial advice based on mathematical rules or algorithms. These algorithms are designed by financial advisors, investment managers and data scientists, and coded in software by programmers. These algorithms are executed by software and do not require a human advisor to impart financial advice to a client. The software utilizes its algorithms to automatically allocate, manage and optimize clients' assets for either short-run or long-run investment. Robo-advisors are categorized based on the extent of personalization, discretion, involvement, and human interaction.

There are over 100 robo-advisory services. Investment management robo-advice is considered a breakthrough in formerly exclusive wealth management services, bringing services to a broader audience at a lower cost than traditional human advice. Robo-advisors collect financial situation information from the client to determine risk tolerance. Then, robo-advisors allocate a client's assets on the basis of risk preferences and desired target return. While robo-advisors have the capability of allocating client assets in many investment products such as stocks, bonds, futures, commodities, and real estate, the advice is often directed towards exchange-traded funds. Clients can choose between offerings with passive asset allocation techniques or active asset management styles.

History
The first robo-advisor Betterment was launched in 2010 by Jon Stein, a 30-year-old entrepreneur. Thereafter, robo-advisors increased in popularity. The first robo-advisers were used as online interfaces by financial managers to manage and balance clients' assets. Robo-adviser technology was not new to this field, as this kind of software has been in use by financial advisers and managers since the early 2000s. But they were made publicly available in 2008 for the first time to the general public who were in dire need of managing their assets personally. By the end of 2015, robo-advisers from almost 100 companies around the globe were managing $60 billion in assets of clients. In June 2016, robo-advisor Wealthfront announced a partnership with the Nevada State Treasurer to offer a 529 plan for college savings.

In 2015, Hong Kong based 8 Securities launched one of Asia's first robo-advisors in Japan, followed there in 2016 by Money Design, Co., under the brand name THEO, and WealthNavi. In 2017, Singapore based StashAway received a capital markets services license from the Monetary Authority of Singapore.

Definition
A robo-advisor can be defined as "a self-guided online wealth management service that provides automated investment advice at low costs and low account minimums, employing portfolio management algorithms". Some robo-advisors do have an element of human interference and supervision. 

Legally, the term "financial advisor" applies to any entity giving advice about securities. Most robo-advisor services are instead limited to providing portfolio management (i.e. allocating investments among asset classes) without addressing issues such as estate and retirement planning and cash-flow management, which are also the domain of financial planning.

Robo advisors provide "personal financial advice" in addition to "general financial advice". Personal financial advice is tailored to the financial situation and goals of the client, and is in their best interests. General financial advice doesn't take into account the personal situation or goals of the client, or how it might affect them personally.

Other designations for these financial technology companies include "automated investment advisor", "automated investment management", "online investment advisor" and "digital investment advisor".

Areas served
While robo-advisors are most common in the United States, they are also present in Germany, Australia, India, Canada, and Singapore.

Robo-advisors are extending into different aspects of financial advice, such as advising retail customers on how much money to spend versus save, how to plan for retirement and decumulation (selling off securities over time), and tax loss harvesting.

Methodology
The tools they employ to manage client portfolios differ little from the portfolio management software already widely used in the profession. 

The portfolios that robo-advisors offer are typically exchange-traded funds, but some offer portfolios of individual stocks. Typically they employ modern portfolio theory, which minimizes risk for a given expected return. Some are designed for use with socially responsible investing, Halal investing, or strategies similar to hedge funds.

Consumer access
The customer acquisition costs and time constraints faced by traditional human advisors have left many middle-class investors underadvised or unable to obtain portfolio management services because of the minimums imposed on investable assets. The average financial planner has a minimum investment amount of $50,000, while minimum investment amounts for robo-advisors start as low as $500 in the United States and as low as £1 in the United Kingdom. In addition to having lower minimums on investable assets compared to traditional human advisors, robo-advisors charge fees ranging from 0.2% to 1.0% of Assets Under Management, while traditional financial planners charged average fees of 1.35% of Assets Under Management, according to a survey conducted by AdvisoryHQ News.

Regulation
In the United States, robo-advisors must be registered investment advisors, which are regulated by the Securities and Exchange Commission. In the United Kingdom they are regulated by the Financial Conduct Authority.

Total assets under management
The following are the largest robo-advisors by assets under management:

References

Online financial services companies
Web applications
Financial advisors